Carmelo is a given name.

Carmelo may also refer to:

CARMELO, a program written by Nate Silver to predict the future performance of NBA players
Carmelo, Uruguay
Carmelo (film), a film by Jorge R. Gutierrez